Charles Loring Jackson (April 4, 1847 – October 31, 1935) was the first significant organic chemist in the United States. He brought organic chemistry to the United States from Germany  and educated a generation of American organic chemists.

Personal life
Charles Loring Jackson was born in Boston on April 4, 1845. He graduated from Harvard College in 1867 after studying in private schools in Boston. He joined the Harvard chemistry department as an assistant lecturer immediately after graduation and on his twenty-first birthday became an assistant professor in 1871. He was the third member of the department which consisted of Josiah Parsons Cooke and Henry Barker Hill.

In 1870, Jackson developed a chemistry course which evolved into Chemistry I, that he taught for more than forty years.

As an adult Jackson enjoyed amateur theatricals and writing poetry and romantic fiction. In retirement he enjoyed gardening at his beautiful estate in Pride's Crossing near Beverly, Massachusetts.

Learning chemistry
While studying chemistry at Harvard in 1873, Jackson had a slight attack of rheumatic fever. When he returned back to work his professor advised that he take a year's leave of absence and study in Europe. He, therefore, traveled to Heidelberg, Germany to study at Ruprecht Karl University of Heidelberg. There he trained under Robert Bunsen, a specialist in gas analysis and platinum metals. Although he did not intend to make organic chemistry his specialty, he also worked with the organic chemist August Wilhelm von Hofmann. However, Hofmann inspired Jackson to pursue organic chemistry as a career. Jackson was known to have said that he learned to "use his mind" under Hofmann, "an activity that Bunsen rather discouraged."

During Jackson's time in Heidelberg Hofmann was writing his Faraday Lectures on Justus von Liebig and had Jackson correct his English. This was a great opportunity for Jackson to develop an intimate association with Hofmann.
In 1874 Jackson published his first paper which dealt with organic selenium compounds.

Research at Harvard
In 1875 after returning to Harvard Jackson synthesized the first new organic compound made in a Harvard laboratory, p-bromobenzyl bromide. This provided a method of producing substituted benzyl compounds with interesting results, such as a synthesis of anthracene. In the following years he developed syntheses of flavoring compounds curcumin and vanillin. He also synthesised benzine tri-sulfonic acid and developed what is now a traditional method of nitrating organic materials, preliminary sulfonation followed by nitration. In the late 1880s he discovered the reaction between highly substituted aromatic halides and malonic ester in which a halogen radical is replaced by a hydrogen, his most prolific source of scientific publications. He also did considerable work on the derivatives of o-quinone, although he missed the discovery of the parent compound by only a small margin.

The European connection
The importance of Jackson's studies in Europe to the development of the organic chemistry industry in the United States should not be underestimated. In the 1870s when Jackson traveled to Europe there literally was no organic synthesis being done in the United States either in academia or in industry. This short-coming became very evident with the advent of World War I and World War II when the supply of strategic organic materials from Germany to the United States was cut off. Had the United States been unable to quickly develop an organic synthesis capability, the outcome of the World Wars might have been quite different.

Several of Jackson's students at Harvard, Roger Adams, Farrington Daniels, Frank C. Whitmore, James B. Sumner and James Bryant Conant to name a few, were instrumental in developing organic synthesis in the United States. Some of them had traveled to Germany to study organic synthesis using the connections Jackson had established.

In Jackson's time academic research was generally quite open, resulting in an open and internationalist philosophy among scientists. The World Wars put this philosophy at odds with commonly held beliefs about national security, intellectual property, trade secrets and technology leakage.

Accomplishments
"In 1897, he received the coveted Erving professorship. He belonged to the American and the German chemical societies and the American and the British Associations for the Advancement of Science, being a corresponding member of the latter. He was elected to the American Academy of Arts and Sciences and to the Natural Academy of Sciences in 1883. From 1894 to 1903, he was Chairman of the Division of Chemistry. Due to his interest in the student body, he was, for fifty years, a proctor in the dormitories of the Harvard Yard--Gray 5 from 1868 to 1871 and Holsworthy II from 1871 to 1918."

Publications

Fiction
Charles Loring Jackson, The Gold Point and Other Strange Stories, Stratford Company of Boston (1926)

Scientific
Charles Loring Jackson, Biographical memoir of Henry Barker Hill, 1849-1903, National Academy of Sciences (January 1, 1905) ASIN B0008AF3CW
Charles Loring Jackson, On certain colored substances derived from nitro compounds, ASIN B0008CBY1E
Charles Loring Jackson, Charles Robert Sanger: [Biographical notice], Proceedings of the American Academy of Arts and Sciences, ASIN B0008CWAYE
Charles Loring Jackson, On certain nitro derivatives of the vicinal tribrombenzol, Harvard University—Chemical Laboratory Contributions, ASIN B0008CBYHS
Charles Loring Jackson, Memoir of Josiah Parsons Cooke, 1827-1894, National Academy of Sciences (January 1, 1902) ASIN B0008AF390
Charles Loring Jackson, On certain derivatives of orthobenzoquinone, American Academy of Arts and Sciences (January 1, 1900) ASIN B0008CBYIC
Charles Loring Jackson, On the action of sodic ethylate on tribromdinitrobenzol, American Academy of Arts and Sciences (January 1, 1898) ASIN B0008CBYH8
Charles Loring Jackson, On certain derivatives of symmetrical trichlorbenzol, American Academy of Arts and Sciences (January 1, 1898) ASIN B0008CBYHI
Charles Loring Jackson, On the oxide of dichlormethoxyquinone-dibenzoylmethylacetal, American Academy of Arts and Sciences (January 1, 1898) ASIN B0008CBYI2
Charles Loring Jackson, Samuel Cabot, John Wilson and Son, University Press (January 1, 1908) ASIN B0008D0U36

References

Frank C. Whitmore, Charles Loring Jackson, Industrial and Engineering Chemistry, Vol. 18, No. 8 (1926)

External links
National Academy of Sciences Biographical Memoir

19th-century American chemists
American science writers
American short story writers
Harvard College alumni
Harvard University faculty
Organic chemists
1847 births
1935 deaths
20th-century American chemists